Lenora Garfinkel (1930 – April 29, 2020) was an American architect, specializing in the design and construction of Jewish ritual buildings.

Childhood and education 
Born Lenora Fay Josephy in 1930 in the Bronx, Garfinkel attended the High School of Music & Art in Manhattan and was among the first women to enroll in Cooper Union’s architecture program in the class of 1950.  She took the Cooper Union entrance exam on a Sunday instead of Saturday, the Jewish Sabbath; she tested under a pseudonym to increase her chances of admission.

Career 
Garfinkel maintained an architecture office in Monsey, New York, for more than 50 years. The business was ranked in the top 8% of New York licensed contractors. 

She designed the Atrium, an Ultra-Orthodox events space in Monsey, the Viznitz Synagogue, and the Masores Bais Yaakov school in Brooklyn. She became an authority on the religious regulations and design specifications for Jewish ritual institutions, including mikvahs and synagogues.

Personal 
She was married to Sam Garfinkel, a pharmacist, in 1958. The couple had five children, 20 grandchildren, and over 50 great-grandchildren. Two of her sons are also architects.

Garfinkel died in April 2020, from COVID-19 in The Bronx during the COVID-19 pandemic in New York City. Her son and grandson died from the virus within a week of her death.

References 

1930 births
2020 deaths
20th-century American architects
American Jews
American women architects
Architects from New York (state)
Cooper Union alumni
Jewish architects
Fellows of the American Institute of Architects
People from Monsey, New York
Date of birth missing
Date of death missing
Deaths from the COVID-19 pandemic in New York (state)